Xiong'an railway station (Chinese: 雄安站) is a railway station in Xiong County, Xiong'an New Area, Hebei, China. It opened on 27 December 2020.

Design
This station project is collaborated designed by AREP in 2017, China Railway Design Corporation,  China Architecture Design & Research Group, BMEDI and China Academy of Urban Planning & Design. The construction began on August 29, 2018 by China Railway 12th Bureau Group, China Railway Construction Engineering Group,  China Construction Third Engineering Bureau and finished in the end of 2020.

The concept design is inspired by the water culture of Baiyang Lake. The oval waterdrop shape symbolised a dewdrop on a lotus or a gushing spring. Undulating layers on the roof look like ripple on the water surface. The facade design uses element of the traditional Chinese grand hall showing  Chinese cultural genes.

It has a solar panel array on its roof with an installed capacity of 6 MW.

Structure 
The station hall of Xiong'an has three floors overground and two floors underground. Among the floors, the ground floor is waiting hall and bus terminus and the second floor is the platform floor for railway and reserved Xiong'an Rail Transit Line R1 & R2. The third floor is the elevated waiting hall. The basement first floor is for the future business development, and the basement second floor is for the reserved metro line M1.

Future

The station will also be connected to the Xiong'an Rail Transit system in the future.

References

Railway stations in Hebei
Railway stations in China opened in 2020
Stations on the Beijing–Xiong'an intercity railway